Orhan Eralp (1915 – 6 June 1994) was a Turkish diplomat. 

Eralp graduated from Robert College in 1933 and the University of London Law School in 1939.

He was Ambassador of Turkey to Yugoslavia (1959–1964), France (1976–1978), Sweden (1957–1959), the Permanent Representative of Turkey to the United Nations (1964–1969, 1978–1980) and NATO (1972–1976).

References

1915 births
1994 deaths
Ambassadors of Turkey to France
Ambassadors of Turkey to Sweden
Ambassadors of Turkey to Yugoslavia
Permanent Representatives of Turkey to the United Nations
Permanent Representatives of Turkey to NATO
Robert College alumni